Xuman Records is an independent Russian record label founded by Alexander Xuman in 2006.

Occupation 
Xuman Records is releasing and promoting audio tracks and video materials. However, the label's main activity is music production, i.e. composing, music arrangement, recording, mixing and mastering.

History 
The studio was opened on September 9, 2006. The first release was on November 11, 2006. From 2006 until 2009 the label did not have a specific music policy and released mainly electronic underground. In December, 2009 the label presented its first release after the renewal - Xuman Records Tales Compilation (XR001). The track list of this release included On-The-Go, Mujuice, Bajinda Behind the Enemy Lines, Xuman, Kapus, Slideshow Park and others. Their next release was 'Panic' a single by Xuman (XR002). Later the label released the first single by On-The-Go called 'In The Wind' (XR003) and then 'In The Wind Remixed' EP (XR004). Xuman's next release was the first album of Xuman band called Golden Age (XR005). Then On-The-Go was released with a new 'One Spark' EP (XR006).

Releases 
 XR001: Xuman Records Tales Compilation (LP) - 2.01.2010
 XR002: Xuman - Panic (Single) - 5.07.2010
 XR003: On-The-Go - In The Wind (Single) - 13.09.2010
 XR004: On-The-Go - In The Wind Remixed (EP) - 14.10.2010
 XR005: Xuman - Golden Age (LP) - 20.03.2011
 XR006: On-The-Go - One Spark (EP) - 4.07.2011
 XR007: Kapus - io (EP) - 29.04.2012
 XR008: On-The-Go - One Spark Remixed (EP) - 9.09.2012
 XR009: Xuman - Play (Single) - 24.12.2012
 XR010: Xuman - 49 Nymphomaniacs (EP) - 14.05.2013
 XR011: Mana Island - Mana Island (Single) - 18.06.2013
 XR012: Mana Island — Borderline (Single) — 27.08.2013
 XR013: Little Magic Shop — Planet After Light Preasure (EP) — 19.11.2013
 XR014: Xuman — Mood Dealer (EP) — 21.02.2014
 XR015: Mana Island — Lono (EP) — 11.03.2014
 XR016: Cola Koala feat. Majik — Need Your Love (EP) — 25.03.2014
 XR017: Scarlet Dazzle — Inflorescence (EP) — 08.04.2014
 XR018: Everything Is Made in China — Through Daybreak Into the Dark (Single) — 27.06.2014
 XR019: Everything Is Made in China — Through Daybreak Into the Dark Remixes (EP) - 23.09.2014
 XR020: Mana Island — Stare (Single) — 14.10.2014
 XR021: Xuman — K.O. (Single) — 8.12.2014
 XR022: Xuman — Kung-Fu (Single) — 10.02.2015

Artists of the label 
List of artists who were released or recorded in Xuman Records.

 Aanbreken
 Alisa Franka (Алиса Игнатьева)
 Bajinda Behind the Enemy Lines
 Camel in Space
 Cola Koala
 Denis Korobkov
 Diva Rhys Meyers
 Esthetix
 Everything Is Made in China (EIMIC)
 Extatica
 Fridance
 Glintshake
 Hospital
 INWIRES
 Kapus
 Kiriloff
 Little Magic Shop
 Majestic
 Mana Island
 Mujuice
 No Name Band
 On-The-Go
 Pompeya
 Q-dubы
 Scarlet Dazzle
 Slideshow Park
 Stan Williams
 STI
 The O
 Type Machine
 Upstation
 Weloveyouwinona
 Xuman
 Сегодня в мире

References

External links 

 Xuman Records on Flickr
 Xuman on Soundcloud
 On-The-Go on Soundcloud

Russian record labels
Record labels established in 2006
Indie rock record labels